The Judo event at the 2022 Mediterranean Games was held in Oran, Algeria, from 29 June to 1 July 2022.

Medal table

Medalists

Men

Women

References

External links
 
Official site
Results book

 
Sports at the 2022 Mediterranean Games
2022
Mediterranean Games
2022 Mediterranean Games
Mediterranean Games